SRC Biljanini Izvori is a multi-purpose stadium in Ohrid, North Macedonia. It has a seating capacity of 3,980 and is the home ground of FK Ohrid Lihnidos, FK Voska Sport and ŽFK Biljanini Izvori. It has also been used by North Macedonia's national team for training.

Concerts and events
 Bijelo Dugme performed a concert on 31 July 2010.
 Aca Lukas performed a concert in front of 7,000 people on 2 August 2013.
 Željko Joksimović performed a concert in front of 10,000 people on 3 August 2013.
 Svetlana Ražnatović CECA performed a concert as part of her Poziv Tour on 1 August 2014.

References

External links
Official Website 
Stadion Biljanini Izvori - Ohrid 

FK Ohrid
Football venues in North Macedonia
Sport in Ohrid